Daniel Isom Vanderpool (1891-1988) was a minister and general superintendent in the Church of the Nazarene. Born September 6, 1891, in Missouri, Dr. Daniel Isom Vaderpool was converted in a Free Methodist Church and began preaching in country schoolhouses within three months. Joining the Church of the Nazarene in 1913, Dr. Vanderpool was educated at John Fletcher and Pasadena (Nazarene) colleges. Nineteen years as district superintendent preceded his election to the general superintendency in 1949. He served in this position until 1964. After retirement in that year he became general superintendent emeritus. Death came on March 21, 1988, with burial in Greenwood/Memory Lawn Mortuary & Cemetery, Phoenix, Maricopa County,
Arizona.

1891 births
1988 deaths
American Nazarene ministers
Free Methodist Church ministers
Vanderpool, Daniel I.